KNSO (channel 51) is a television station licensed to Clovis, California, United States, broadcasting the Spanish-language Telemundo network to the Fresno area. Owned and operated by NBCUniversal's Telemundo Station Group, KNSO maintains a transmitter on Bald Mountain, south of Meadow Lakes in Fresno County.

History
The station first signed on the air on March 22, 1996; originally operating as an independent station, it was originally owned by Sainte Partners II, L.P. During its first two years on the air, KNSO aired religious programming during the morning hours and Asian language programming in the afternoons, as well as programming from the California Music Channel. These programs were largely simulcast via San Francisco independent station KTSF-TV.

In July 1998, KNSO entered into a local marketing agreement (LMA) with Pappas Telecasting Companies, then-owner of Fox affiliate KMPH-TV (channel 26); Pappas then signed an affiliation agreement to make KNSO the market's WB affiliate, taking the affiliation from Clovis-based KGMC (channel 43). On January 1, 2001, KNSO swapped affiliations with KFRE-TV (channel 59), becoming a Telemundo affiliate; shortly beforehand, Pappas entered into an LMA with KFRE, resulting in the WB affiliation being relocated to KFRE. The station became a Telemundo owned-and-operated station, when the network's then-new parent company NBC bought the station in May 2003.

In March 2004, KNSO vacated its McKinley Road studios and moved to a new facility in North Fresno at 30 River Park Place. The station also implemented an advanced operational environment, making KNSO one of the most advanced television stations in the country. This experimental operation system allowed for a "limited intervention" master control center, which involves a highly automated system of operation. The station automation systems are almost completely self-reliant and provide for little to no assistance by the station personnel in running the on-air switching, monitoring and logging. This system utilizes the Florical Airboss, centralized sales and traffic systems, and various Grass Valley Group broadcast systems, including the Profile XP and Concerto. This experimental operation system has proved successful, and has now been implemented in other station operation control centers.

ZGS Communications took over the operations of KNSO (as well as San Antonio sister station KVDA) on May 1, 2009, although NBC retained the licenses to both stations. Serestar Communications assumed the operations of the station on May 1, 2014, under a joint sales and time brokerage agreement that was to run through December 31, 2020, NBCUniversal retained the KNSO license.

On December 6, 2018, it was announced that NBCUniversal would terminate its local marketing agreement with Serestar in early 2019, making KNSO a full Telemundo O&O for the first time since 2009. This was in conjunction with NBCUniversal's purchase of Serestar-owned Telemundo affiliates KTMW and KULX-CD in Salt Lake City and KCSO-LD in Sacramento. The transaction was completed and the LMA terminated on March 5, 2019.

On February 27, 2020, NBCUniversal agreed to transfer the license assets of KNSO to Cocola Broadcasting in exchange for acquiring the KGMC license. The sale was completed on September 1, 2020. Upon completion of transfer in which the call signs were also swapped, KNSO now operates on UHF channel 27, while KGMC operates on VHF channel 11.

News operation
On September 1, 2015, KNSO launched its first local news production and the second local Spanish-language newscast in the market, Noticiero Telemundo Valle Central. It is an hour-long weekday newscast produced from the studio of Nexstar Broadcasting Group-owned KSEE and KGPE; Serestar elected to partner with the two stations so that the production could leverage the resources of the stations' new facilities. The newscast is anchored and executive produced by Vanessa Ramirez-Avila, formerly of KFTV-DT, and features reporting from KGPE, KSEE, and its Bakersfield sister stations KGET and KKEY-LP.

In 2017, an 11 p.m. weeknight newscast (co-produced and simulcast on sister station KCSO-LD in Sacramento) was added. Branded as Noticiero Telemundo California, the newscast features some Fresno-area news via a pre-recorded package from the KSEE/KGPE studio.

Technical information

Subchannels
The station's digital signal is multiplexed:

Analog-to-digital conversion
KNSO shut down its analog signal, over UHF channel 51, on June 12, 2009, the official date in which full-power television stations in the United States transitioned from analog to digital broadcasts under federal mandate. The station moved its digital signal from its pre-transition VHF channel 5 to channel 11. Through the use of PSIP, digital television receivers display the station's virtual channel as its former UHF analog channel 51.

As part of the SAFER Act, KNSO kept its analog signal on the air until June 26 to inform viewers of the digital television transition through a loop of public service announcements from the National Association of Broadcasters.

References

External links

NSO
Television channels and stations established in 1996
1996 establishments in California
Telemundo Station Group
NSO
Cozi TV affiliates
TeleXitos affiliates
LX (TV network) affiliates
Clovis, California